Sagardwipey Jawker Dhan is a 2019 Bengali action adventure film directed by Sayantan Ghosal and written by Sougata Basu with influence of the original story by Hemendra Kumar Roy. The film is based on the adventure story of Bimal-Kumar duo written by Hemendra Kumar Roy. It is the second movie after Jawker Dhan. The film had a theatrical release on 6 December 2019.

Plot 
Bimal and Kumar meet a petrol pump owner Bakashyam Dhar, whose father Radheshyam Dhar was a scientist. Radheshyam was very adventurous and many years back he sited a remote island in the sea of South East Asia, where he discovered a stone, which has a layer of a mythical chemical compound named Red Mercury. Radheshyam's research suggested that this chemical could be a very effective substitute to the gradually exhausting fossil fuel.

Bimal and Kumar begin their quest for this chemical. In this venture, Bimal comes across a doctor, Rubi Chatterjee. Rubi is also in search of the same mythical compound which is necessary to save the life of a child.

Cast 
 Parambrata Chatterjee as Bimal
 Gaurav Chakrabarty as Kumar
 Koel Mallick as Dr. Rubi Chatterjee
 Kanchan Mullick as Bakashyam Dhar
 Rajatava Dutta as Al-Mahri
 Koushik Sen as Hiranmoy Bose
 Adolina Chakrabarty as Rumi

Soundtrack

References

External links
 

2019 films
Bengali-language Indian films
2010s Bengali-language films
Films directed by Sayantan Ghosal
Indian action adventure films
Films scored by Bickram Ghosh